Alexander D. Nesic (born April 17, 1976) is a Serbian-French-American film and television actor, best known for his work in the miniseries Sleeper Cell.

Early life and education
Born in Santa Barbara, California, and raised in Antibes, France and Hawaii, Nesic is of Serbian and French descent, and holds dual United States/French citizenship and speaks four languages fluently. He earned his B.A. in European History and Spanish Literature from Santa Clara University.

Career
He has been featured in the feature films High Crimes, which starred Ashley Judd and Jim Caviezel, and the comedy What Boys Like. He played Christian Aumont on the TV series Sleeper Cell.

Nesic has also appeared in guest roles on CSI: Miami, JAG, As If, Angel, Felicity and Unhappily Ever After.

Personal life
Nesic became engaged with fellow Sleeper Cell co-star Melissa Sagemiller after proposing to her in South of France in July 2006. The couple share two children.

Partial filmography
Unhappily Ever After (1 episode, 1998) (TV)
Felicity (1 episode, 2000) (TV)
The Groomsmen (2001)
Angel (1 episode, 2001) (TV)
As If (1 episode, 2002) (TV)
High Crimes (2002)
Crossing Jordan (1 episode, 2002) (TV)
Journey Into Night (2002)
JAG (1 episode, 2003) (TV)
Malibu Eyes (2004) (V)
CSI: Miami (1 episode, 2005) (TV)
Sleeper Cell (10 episodes, 2005) (TV)
NCIS (1 episode, 2006) (TV)
Drifter (2007/I)
Say It in Russian (2007)
Eleventh Hour (1 episode, 2008) (TV)
Dirty Sexy Money (2 episodes, 2007–2009) (TV)
From Mexico with Love (2009)
In Fidelity (2009)
Undercovers (1 episode, 2010) (TV)

References

External links

1976 births
American male film actors
American male television actors
American people of French descent
American people of Serbian descent
Living people
Male actors from Santa Barbara, California
Santa Clara University alumni
American expatriates in France